Vedad is a Bosnian masculine name of Arabic origin meaning "friendship, love". It is commonly used in Bosnia and Herzegovina. The name and more specifically its Arabic original name "Widad" is cognate with the Hebrew name "Medad" which also has the same meanings; love and friendship, coming from their shared Semitic origins.

People
Vedad Ibišević (born 1984), Bosnian footballer
Vedad Karic (born 1988), Bosnian cyclist
Vedad Radonja (born 2001), Bosnian footballer

See also
Vedat (name), Turkish variant

References

Masculine given names
Bosnian masculine given names
Bosniak masculine given names